Yvonne Olivia Cole Meo (1923–2016) was an American artist known primarily for sculpture and printmaking. Born in Seattle, Washington, Meo lived in Los Angeles for most of her life, primarily in Altadena CA.

Education and work life

Meo received her BA from University of California, Los Angeles and her MA from California State College.

Meo taught art at and Fisk University and Van Nuys Senior High School, Van Nuys, CA in the late 50's and through the 1960s.

Career
Meo was encouraged by Charles White to show her work in galleries in Los Angeles during the 1960s.

The Sapphire Show (1970) was the first survey of African American women artists in Los Angeles and, likely, the United States. Featuring Yvonne Meo along with Gloria Bohanon, Suzanne Jackson, Betye Saar, Senga Nengudi (formerly Sue Irons) and Eileen Nelson (formerly Eileen Abdulrashid) this collaborative project was staged over the July Fourth weekend in 1970 at Gallery 32, the experimental space run by Suzanne Jackson from her loft in the Mediterranean Revival Granada Buildings in Los Angeles from 1969 to 1970.

The Sapphire Show took place on the July Fourth holiday weekend, between solo shows of Elizabeth Leigh-Taylor and Yvonne Cole Meo, at the conclusion of Gallery 32's brief but influential run. The show lasted only five days but was an influential moment for African American women artists and the growing Black Arts Movement in Los Angeles.

Sapphire Show, You've Come a Long Way Baby, The Sapphire Show (2021) was organized and exhibited at Ortuzar Projects, NY, NY. Meo's work was featured in the exhibition along with the other six original artists.

Yvonne Cole Meo, Le Dilettante (1965)

Take 2 (1994) Fisher Gallery, USC in collaboration with the California Afro American Museum and LAX/94

African American artists in Los Angeles sponsored by the City of Los Angeles, Department of Cultural Affairs. This was a three-part exhibition covering 60 years of art Reaction 1945-60 held at Los Angeles Municipal Art Gallery, January 21-April 10, 2005; Pathways 1966-89 held at California African American Museum and Los Angeles Municipal Art Gallery, January 13-April 10, 2005; Fade 1990-2003 held at Craft and Folk Art Museum, Luckman Gallery at Cal State L.A., and University Fine Art Gallery at Cal State L.A., January 16-February 28, 2004.

Yvonne Cole Meo was part of the 1977 Art critic and historian collective, Witness Inc.

In addition, her works have been exhibited at the Ankrum Gallery, Westwood Art Association Gallery, The Graphic International Exhibit in Leipzig, Germany, the UCLA Print Show, the Redondo Beach Art Festival, the Hollywood Bowl, the Pasadena Art Festival, the Fine Arts Gallery of San Diego, the Oakland Art Museum and more.

Catalogues and Archives
African American artists in Los Angeles: a survey, exhibition 
Black Artists on Art by Samella Lewis and Ruth Waddy (vol I)
Contemporary Afro-American Women Artists exhibition records, 1969–1978, Smithsonian Museum
The Family Bond and Dancers Archives of American Art, Smithsonian Museum
South of Pico; African American Artists in Los Angeles in the 1960s and 1970s, Duke University Press
Oakland Museum Permanent collection
Online Archive of California

Auction
Yvonne Cole Meo's work has been offered at auction multiple times. Among the artist's sold works is "Cotton is Still King #4", which realized US$1,000 at Swann Auction Galleries in 2017

Family Life
Yvonne Olivia Cole was married to businessman Eugene Meo in 1959.  She was the daughter of concert pianist Lorenza Jordan Cole.

External links
 https://www.mutualart.com/Artist/Yvonne-Cole-Meo/C20612115D477DDC

References 

1923 births
American women artists
2016 deaths